The National Assembly for Wales (Official Languages) Act 2012 (anaw 1) was an Act of the National Assembly for Wales that was given royal assent on 12 November 2012. It is significant in that it is the first Act passed in Wales to become law in over 600 years.

The Act consists principally of amendments to the Government of Wales Act 2006, and provides that the National Assembly for Wales shall have two official languages, English and Welsh; and that they shall be treated equally.

It was not the first bill passed by the National Assembly for Wales, which was the bill for the Local Government Byelaws (Wales) Act 2012, but was the first to receive royal assent and so become law. The bill was passed by the National Assembly for Wales on 3 October 2012, but then underwent a statutory period of intimation, so that lawyers could verify that it fell within the remit of the National Assembly for Wales. Royal assent was given when the Welsh Seal was affixed to the Letters Patent by First Minister Carwyn Jones on 12 November 2012; it was gazetted on 16 November.

Items of primary legislation passed by the National Assembly for Wales between 2008 and 2011 are known as Assembly Measures. The original system of Welsh law was abolished under Henry VIII.

See also

 Welsh Courts Act 1942
 Welsh Language Act 1967
Welsh Language Act 1993
Welsh Language (Wales) Measure 2011

References

Acts of the National Assembly for Wales
2012 in British law
2012 in Wales
2012 in British politics
English language
Welsh language
2012
Language legislation
Language policy in the United Kingdom